Matt Martelli (born December 10, 1972) and Joshua Martelli (born November 9, 1974), known together professionally as The Martelli Brothers, are American filmmakers and commercial producers and directors. The brothers write, direct, and produce their films and commercial projects together, and are known for being extremely hands-on with the various stages/aspects of their work. They often write and/or contribute to creative concepts and scripts, assist with pre-production and planning, oversee FX and stunt coordination, and frequently operate cameras on set. Joshua has won multiple awards for film editing, and typically retains "final cut" control of their films and commercial projects.

Background

Early life

Matt and Joshua Martelli were born in Kalamazoo, Michigan to Frank and Mary Martelli. Their sister Margaret Martelli was born in 1979. The Martelli family lived in a small home south of the downtown Kalamazoo area for most of the brothers early childhood. The Martelli parents worked as medical management professionals at several hospitals in Kalamazoo, while the boys, and their younger sister Maggie attended local public schools. Though the neighborhood was poor, and at times violent, The Martelli Brothers site their experience as "young white kids, living in a predominantly black and Asian community", as one that bonded them and taught them "street smarts". Their father Frank enrolled them in the Okinawan Karate Academy, where they studied for several years under Sensei James Thompson, an eighth-degree black belt and forty-five-year veteran of the art. Both boys were encouraged from a young age to develop an appreciation for the arts, including music, theatre, and film. They attended the local YMCA and enrolled in numerous summer classes ranging from hiking, camping, archery, to early computer science courses. They were also given piano and violin lessons. Their mother Mary came from a large family that lived in nearby South Haven area on Lake Michigan, and the boys spent countless weekends and holidays at the lake with family members. In 1984, at the age of ten and twelve, Joshua and Matt moved with their family to San Diego where they remain today.

Early education

Matt attended and was a member of the first graduating class of Kazoo School, an arts-based early education program in Kalamazoo. Later, in California, both brothers developed an awareness and love of independent filmmaking through their exposure to skateboarding culture. Joshua sites his election to the La Mesa Middle School seventh-grade student body as the "Audio/Video Monitor" as a pivotal moment in developing an understanding and appreciation for videography and editing. He was tasked with video taping the "spirit assemblies" and editing them "deck-to-deck" on VHS tape. The brothers attended Helix High School in La Mesa, California and both enrolled in the Graphic Design ROP program under the direction of Rick Benson and Richard Dirk. It was Richard Dirk, (who later became the Art Director for the Lambesis Agency), that inspired Matt and Joshua to learn more about the history and impact of graphic design. This was also the timeframe when digital technology began to become prominent in the graphic design and printing trades, and the brothers gained their first exposure to Adobe Photoshop and Adobe Illustrator on Macintosh computers. Both brothers graduated from Helix High School and enrolled at Palomar College in North San Diego.

Professional education

The Martelli Brothers continued their graphic design education at Palomar College graphics arts program run by Neil Bruington. In the fall of 1996, Joshua attended the Recording Workshop in Chillicothe, Ohio – where he learned studio recording and production techniques. He returned to San Diego and began an internship at Studio West, a prominent recording studio in San Diego. After completing his internship and working as a freelance engineer, Joshua eventually took a position at Network Music as a sound designer and produced over three hundred hours of effects CD's for the Network Music library. Matthew meanwhile, became a professor's assistant to Mr. Bruington, but eventually left Palomar to take positions at several advertising agencies in San Diego. It was his dislike of the "typical corporate marketing culture" that led him to conceive of the idea of the "anti-agency" – which later became the genesis for forming Mad Media. In 1997 Joshua enrolled in the "Recording Arts" and "Music Industry" programs at Chico State University. He was offered a teacher's assistant position under professor Joel Alexander and worked as his assistant while completing both degrees through the fall of 1999. He then returned to San Diego and began working with Matt as the Director of TV/Film Production at Mad Media.

Mad Media

Marketing and Advertising Agency

In the summer of 1995, while attending Palomar College and working for a digital film lab, Matt began to acquire freelance clients in the growing action sports industry. The inaugural ESPN Summer X Games was held that year (1995), and had a profound impact on the action sports community. It suddenly received global attention, and with that attention came opportunity. Recognizing the need to reconcile the difference between the "do-it-yourself" mentality of the action sports community, and (the often sterile and disconnected atmosphere of many) national advertising agencies, Matt formed Mad Media.

The goal of Mad Media was to connect endemic action sports brands with legitimate global marketing opportunities and to also foster non-endemic brand growth by using authentic and genuine messaging. In other words, core action sports companies had an opportunity to reach a far greater customer base, but needed help in dealing with the corporate environment.  While at the same time brands like Nike Gatorade, and Snickers became interested in using action sports to market their products, but needed guidance on the approach. Mad Media began executing marketing and advertising campaigns on both ends of that spectrum – working with core skateboarding companies like Osiris Shoes and Expedition Skateboards. Mad Media produced a massive advertising campaign for Osiris Shoes for example, that included the very first "branded video campaign" for any action sports company on the Internet and culminated in a sixteen-episode TV show for FUEL TV.  Dubbed "The Aftermath Tour" – it was the largest skateboard tour in history with over fifty U.S. stops and nearly forty stops in Europe.

Production Company

Mad Media continued to grow throughout the late 1990s, and by the year 2000 Joshua Martelli joined Matt at Mad Media as Director of TV/Film Production, and began to build a professional in-house video and film production department. Mad Media began to routinely produce television commercials, web videos, trade show videos, DVD projects, and interactive branded content for a variety of clients. They also began to explore other markets including music and entertainment, automotive, and the emerging sport of mixed martial arts.

Gymkhana

 The Martelli Brothers are best known for their work directing and producing the most successful viral automotive video franchise in history, Ken Block's Gymkhana series. The wildly popular trilogy of Gymkhana clips, as well as the over twenty ancillary supporting videos created for professional rally racer and former DC Shoes owner Ken Block, have been viewed collectively over 100 million times. The Brothers produced and directed "Ken Block Gymkhana Practice", "Ken Block’s Gymkhana Two: The Infomercial", and "Gymkhana THREE, Part 2; Playground; l’Autodrome, France", after which they concluded their work with Ken and began focusing on work with other athletes. The complete collection of their work on the project can be viewed at www.madmedia.com

Filmography
 DC SHOES: KEN BLOCK GYMKHANA PRACTICE
 DC SHOES: KEN BLOCK GYMKHANA TWO THE INFOMERCIAL
 DC SHOES: Ken Block's Gymkhana THREE, Part 2; Ultimate Playground; l'Autodrome, France
 Street Prophetz
 Slammed
 Amber Smith
 Stepping Up
 The Next Invasion
 Motorhead
 The Chronicles of Bebo
 UTVUnderground Presents: RJ Anderson's XP1K
 UTVUnderground Presents: RJ Anderson's XP1K 2
 UTVUnderground Presents: RJ Anderson's XP1K 3
 UTVUnderground Presents: RJ Anderson's XP1K 4

Awards
Official Honoree: 13th Annual Webby Awards for Ken Block: Gymkhana Practice

YouTube.com
 Top 10 Most Viewed Clips of 2010 (#10)
 # 1 Top Rated Video of All Time – Auto Channel (2010)
 # 2 Top Favorite Video of All Time – Auto Channel (2010)
 # 5 Most Viewed Video of All Times –Auto Channel (2010)

Viral Video
 # 2 on the "Top 20 Viral Global Video Ads of 2010"

Ad Age
 # 6 on Top Viral Videos list for 2010

2011 People’s Telly Awards – Three Nominations

2011 Communicator Awards
 Gold Award of Excellence – Film/Video – Automotive/Vehicles
 Gold Award of Excellence – Editing
 Silver Award of Distinction – Audio/Sound Design

2011 ONE Show Awards
 ONE Show Silver Pencil – Branded Content
 ONE Show Merit Award – Non-Broadcast
 ONE Show Entertainment Merit Award – Online Branded

2011 IAC – Internet Advertising Competition
 Best Entertainment Online Video

2011 Shorty Award
 Best Use of a Video for a Social Media Campaign

References
http://www.indepthmedia.co/

American film producers
American film directors
Sibling filmmakers